The  was a Japanese kin group in Dewa Province during the Sengoku Period and Edo period.

History
The clan claimed descent from Shiba Kaneyori. 

The castle town of Tendō was the clan center.

Leaders of the clan were patrons of Hiroshige.

See also
 Naomasa Nakahachi

References

External links
 天童氏 at harimaya.com 

Japanese clans